Shahr-e ziba is a neighborhood in the western part of Tehran.

Neighbourhoods in Tehran